Makoní (Maconi, Macuní) is an extinct Maxakalian language of Brazil.

Makoní is documented in word lists collected in 1816-1818.

Distribution
Makoní was historically spoken in the Caravelas River area of Bahia, Brazil.

Further reading
Métraux, Alfred and Curt Nimuendajú. 1946. The Mashacalí, Patashó, and Malalí Linguistic Families. In Julian H. Steward (ed.), The Marginal Tribes, 541-545. Smithsonian Institution, Washington: Bureau of American Ethnology.

References

Maxakalían languages
Extinct languages of South America
Languages of Brazil